The 2016 Waco Showdown was a professional tennis tournament played on outdoor hard courts. It was the 2nd edition of the tournament and part of the 2016 ITF Women's Circuit, offering a total of $50,000 in prize money. It took place in Waco, Texas, United States, on 7–13 November 2016.

Singles main draw entrants

Seeds 

 1 Rankings as of 31 October 2016.

Other entrants 
The following player received a wildcard into the singles main draw:
  Usue Maitane Arconada
  Danielle Collins
  Ellie Halbauer
  Blair Shankle

The following player received entry by a protected ranking:
  Michaëlla Krajicek

The following player received entry by a special exempt:
  Beatriz Haddad Maia

The following player received entry by a junior exempt:
  Bianca Andreescu

The following players received entry from the qualifying draw:
  Mihaela Buzărnescu
  Gabriela Dabrowski
  Chanelle Van Nguyen
  Caitlin Whoriskey

The following player received entry by a lucky loser spot:
  Ashley Weinhold

Champions

Singles

 Beatriz Haddad Maia def.  Grace Min, 6–2, 3–6, 6–1

Doubles

 Michaëlla Krajicek /  Taylor Townsend def.  Mihaela Buzărnescu /  Renata Zarazúa, walkover

External links 
 2016 Waco Showdown at ITFtennis.com
 Official website

2016 ITF Women's Circuit
2016 in American tennis
Tennis tournaments in the United States